General Upton may refer to:

Arthur Upton (1777–1855), British Army general
Emory Upton (1839–1881), Union Army brigadier general  and brevet major general
George Upton, 3rd Viscount Templetown (1802–1890), British Army general

See also
Gabrielle Upton (born 1964), Attorney General of New South Wales